For UEFA Euro 2016, the 24 participating national teams had to submit squads of 23 players – of which three had to be goalkeepers – by 31 May 2016, 10 days prior to the opening match of the tournament. In the event that a player on the submitted squad list suffered an injury or illness prior to his team's first match of the tournament, that player could be replaced, provided that the team doctor and a doctor from the UEFA Medical Committee both confirmed that the injury or illness is severe enough to prevent the player's participation in the tournament.

The age listed for each player is on 10 June 2016, the first day of the tournament. The number of caps listed for each player does not include any matches played after the start of UEFA Euro 2016. The club listed is the club for which the player last played a competitive match prior to the tournament. The nationality for each club reflects the national association (not the league) to which the club is affiliated.

Group A

France
Manager: Didier Deschamps

France announced their squad on 12 May. Raphaël Varane was initially in the squad but was replaced by Adil Rami after injury. On 28 May, Jérémy Mathieu was replaced by Samuel Umtiti due to an injury. On 31 May, Lassana Diarra was replaced by Morgan Schneiderlin because of an injury. The squad numbers were announced on 30 May.

Romania
Manager: Anghel Iordănescu

Romania announced their final squad on 31 May.

Albania
Manager:  Gianni De Biasi

Albania named their final squad on 31 May.

Switzerland
Manager: Vladimir Petković

Switzerland announced their final squad on 30 May.

Group B

England
Manager: Roy Hodgson

England named their final squad on 31 May.

Russia
Manager: Leonid Slutsky

Russia announced their final squad on 21 May. Midfielder Alan Dzagoev was in the original squad but was dropped due to a broken metatarsal and was replaced by Dmitri Torbinski on 22 May. On 7 June, Igor Denisov was replaced by Artur Yusupov after suffering a hamstring injury.

Wales
Manager: Chris Coleman

Wales announced their final squad on 31 May.

Slovakia
Manager: Ján Kozák

Slovakia announced their final squad on 30 May.

Group C

Germany
Manager: Joachim Löw

Germany announced their final squad on 31 May. On 7 June, Antonio Rüdiger suffered an injury and was replaced by Jonathan Tah one day later.

Ukraine
Manager: Mykhaylo Fomenko

Ukraine announced their final squad on 31 May.

Poland
Manager: Adam Nawałka

Poland announced their final squad on 30 May.

Northern Ireland
Manager: Michael O'Neill

Northern Ireland announced their squad on 28 May.

Group D

Spain
Manager: Vicente del Bosque

Spain announced their final squad on 31 May. Héctor Bellerín replaced Dani Carvajal due to an injury suffered during the UEFA Champions League Final on 28 May.

Czech Republic
Manager: Pavel Vrba

Czech Republic announced their final squad on 31 May.

Turkey
Manager: Fatih Terim

Turkey announced their final squad on 31 May.

Croatia
Manager: Ante Čačić

Croatia named their final squad on 31 May.

Group E

Belgium
Manager: Marc Wilmots

Belgium announced their final squad on 31 May.

Italy
Manager: Antonio Conte

Italy announced their final squad on 31 May.

Republic of Ireland
Manager:  Martin O'Neill

Republic of Ireland announced their final squad on 31 May.

Sweden
Manager: Erik Hamrén

Sweden announced their final squad on 11 May.

Group F

Portugal
Manager: Fernando Santos

Portugal announced their final squad on 17 May.

Iceland
Managers: Heimir Hallgrímsson &  Lars Lagerbäck

Iceland announced their final squad on 9 May.

Austria
Manager:  Marcel Koller

Austria announced their final squad on 31 May.

Hungary
Manager:  Bernd Storck

Hungary announced their final squad on 31 May.

Player representation

By age

Players
Oldest:  Gábor Király
Youngest:  Marcus Rashford

Goalkeepers
Oldest:  Gábor Király
Youngest:  Sergio Rico

Captains
Oldest:  Gianluigi Buffon
Youngest:  Eden Hazard

By club

By club nationality

The above table is the same when it comes to league representation, with only the following exceptions:
 The English league system has 139 representatives, including five players from Wales-based Cardiff City and Swansea City.
 The Swiss league system has 16 representatives, including one player from Liechtenstein-based Vaduz.
 The American league system has 3 representatives, including one player from Canada-based Montreal Impact.

Only England had all its players from the nation's club teams. Iceland, Northern Ireland, and the Republic of Ireland had none of their players from the respective nation's club teams.

References

2016
Squads